Derek Shaw (born 3 March 1959) is a former Australian rules footballer who played with Collingwood in the Victorian Football League (VFL) during the late 1970s and early 1980s.

Shaw, who could play as both a ruckman and forward, came from Bundoora originally. He made his debut at Collingwood in 1978 and the following season kicked 21 goals to earn a spot in their losing Grand Final team.

References

Holmesby, Russell and Main, Jim (2007). The Encyclopedia of AFL Footballers. 7th ed. Melbourne: Bas Publishing.

1959 births
Living people
Australian rules footballers from Victoria (Australia)
Collingwood Football Club players
South Fremantle Football Club players
Greensborough Football Club players